is a former Japanese football player. He first played for Nihon University in 2003 and later transferred to Thespa Kusatsu in 2010 after 7 years.

Club statistics

References

External links

1980 births
Living people
Nihon University alumni
Association football people from Saitama Prefecture
Japanese footballers
J2 League players
Japan Football League players
Thespakusatsu Gunma players
Association football midfielders